The Grenadier is a public house in Belgravia, London. It was originally built in 1720 as the officers' mess for the senior infantry regiment of the British army, the 1st Regiment of Foot Guards, and located in a courtyard of their barracks. It was opened to the public in 1818 as The Guardsman, and subsequently renamed in honour of the Grenadier Guards' actions in the Battle of Waterloo.

Being secluded in a wealthy district of London, it was frequented in the past by the Duke of Wellington and King George IV, and continues to attract an elite clientele such as Madonna and Prince William. It is also said to be haunted by the ghost of a subaltern who was beaten to death for cheating at cards.
The pub was acquired from the green king group by ineos in September 2022.

References

External links
 

Reportedly haunted locations in London
Pubs in the City of Westminster
Commercial buildings completed in 1720
1720 establishments in England
Belgravia